The Vortech Kestrel Jet is an American tip-jet helicopter that was designed in the 1980s. Kits for amateur construction were originally provided by Vortech and plans remain available.

Design and development
It features a single main rotor, a single-seat open cockpit without a windshield and skid landing gear.

The aircraft fuselage is made from bolted-together aluminum tubing. Due to the lack of torque produced there is no tail rotor and instead the Kestrel mounts a circular-shaped rudder for directional control. Controls consist only of cyclic, rudder and throttle.

Specifications (Kestrel Jet)

References

External links

1980s United States ultralight aircraft
1980s United States helicopters
Homebuilt aircraft
Tipjet-powered helicopters
Kestrel Jet